The Mitbek is a tributary of the Höllenau in the north German state of Schleswig-Holstein.

It rises south of Nortorf in the vicinity of Krogaspe and discharges into the Höllenau near Böken (a district of Aukrug).

See also 
List of rivers of Schleswig-Holstein

Rivers of Schleswig-Holstein
Mitbek
Rivers of Germany